Riccardia is a plant genus in the liverwort family Aneuraceae.

Species
The Plant List and Tropicos recognise about 200 accepted species:

A
 Riccardia aberrans  
 Riccardia adglutinata  
 Riccardia aequicellularis  
 Riccardia aequitexta  
 Riccardia aeruginosa  
 Riccardia agumana  
 Riccardia alba  
 Riccardia albomarginata  
 Riccardia alcicornis  
 Riccardia algoides  
 Riccardia amazonica  
 Riccardia andina  
 Riccardia angustata  
 Riccardia anguste-alata  
 Riccardia angustissima  
 Riccardia arcuata  
 Riccardia aspera  
 Riccardia australis  
 Riccardia autoica

B
 Riccardia babindae  
 Riccardia barbiflora  
 Riccardia baumannii  
 Riccardia bipinnatifida  
 Riccardia blasioides  
 Riccardia bliklika  
 Riccardia bogotensis  
 Riccardia boliviensis  
 Riccardia bongeriana  
 Riccardia breviala  
 Riccardia breviramosa  
 Riccardia brunnea

C
 Riccardia calcarea  
 Riccardia canaliculata  
 Riccardia capillacea  
 Riccardia cardotii  
 Riccardia cataractarum  
 Riccardia cervicornis  
 Riccardia chamedryfolia  
 Riccardia changbaishanensis  
 Riccardia chinensis  
 Riccardia ciliolata  
 Riccardia colensoi  
 Riccardia columbica  
 Riccardia comata  
 Riccardia compacta  
 Riccardia comptonii  
 Riccardia costata  
 Riccardia crassa  
 Riccardia crassicaulis  
 Riccardia crassiretis  
 Riccardia crenulata  
 Riccardia crenuliformis

D
 Riccardia demkarmana  
 Riccardia densiramea  
 Riccardia dilatata  
 Riccardia diminuta  
 Riccardia diversiflora

E
 Riccardia effusa  
 Riccardia elata  
 Riccardia elegans

F
 Riccardia fastigiata  
 Riccardia filicina  
 Riccardia flaccia  
 Riccardia flagellaris  
 Riccardia flagellifrons  
 Riccardia flavovirens  
 Riccardia floribunda  
 Riccardia foliacea  
 Riccardia formosensis  
 Riccardia fruticosa  
 Riccardia fucoides  
 Riccardia fuegiensis  
 Riccardia furtiva  
 Riccardia fuscobrunnea

G
 Riccardia geniana  
 Riccardia georgiensis  
 Riccardia glauca  
 Riccardia glaziovii  
 Riccardia gogolensis  
 Riccardia graeffei  
 Riccardia granulata  
 Riccardia grollei  
 Riccardia gunniana

H
 Riccardia hans-meyeri  
 Riccardia hattorii  
 Riccardia hebridensis  
 Riccardia herzogiana  
 Riccardia humilis  
 Riccardia hyalina  
 Riccardia hydra  
 Riccardia hymenophytoides  
 Riccardia hypipamensis

I
 Riccardia ibana  
 Riccardia incurvata  
 Riccardia intercellula  
 Riccardia intricata

J
 Riccardia jackii  
 Riccardia judithae  
 Riccardia jugata

K
 Riccardia kodamae  
 Riccardia kowaldiana  
 Riccardia koyensis

L
 Riccardia latifrons  
 Riccardia lepidomitra  
 Riccardia leptophylla  
 Riccardia leptostachya  
 Riccardia leptothallus  
 Riccardia leratii  
 Riccardia lichenoides  
 Riccardia ligulata  
 Riccardia limbata  
 Riccardia lobulata  
 Riccardia longiflora  
 Riccardia longispica

M
 Riccardia macdonaldiana  
 Riccardia macrantha  
 Riccardia magnicellularis  
 Riccardia makinoana  
 Riccardia marginata  
 Riccardia marionensis  
 Riccardia metzgeriiformis  
 Riccardia micropinna  
 Riccardia multicorpora  
 Riccardia multifida  
 Riccardia multispica  
 Riccardia muscoides  
 Riccardia mycophora

N
 Riccardia nadeaudiana  
 Riccardia nadeaudii  
 Riccardia nagasakiensis  
 Riccardia nana  
 Riccardia nitida  
 Riccardia nudiflora  
 Riccardia nudimitra

O
 Riccardia omkaliensis  
 Riccardia onigajona  
 Riccardia opuntiiformis

P
 Riccardia pallida  
 Riccardia pallidevirens  
 Riccardia palmata  
 Riccardia palmatifida  
 Riccardia papillata  
 Riccardia papulosa  
 Riccardia paramorum  
 Riccardia parasitans  
 Riccardia parvula  
 Riccardia patens  
 Riccardia pauciramea  
 Riccardia pectinata  
 Riccardia pellucida  
 Riccardia pembaiensis  
 Riccardia pengagensis  
 Riccardia pennata  
 Riccardia perspicua  
 Riccardia perssonii  
 Riccardia philippinensis  
 Riccardia phleganiana  
 Riccardia pindaundensis  
 Riccardia pindensis  
 Riccardia pinguis  
 Riccardia pinnatifida  
 Riccardia plana  
 Riccardia planiflora  
 Riccardia platyclada  
 Riccardia plumiformis  
 Riccardia plumosa  
 Riccardia poeppigiana  
 Riccardia prehensilis  
 Riccardia pseudodendroceros  
 Riccardia pumila  
 Riccardia pusilla

R
 Riccardia ramosissima  
 Riccardia regina  
 Riccardia reyesiana  
 Riccardia rivularis  
 Riccardia robusta  
 Riccardia rupicola  
 Riccardia russellii

S
 Riccardia saccatiflora  
 Riccardia sinuata  
 Riccardia smaragdina  
 Riccardia spectabilis  
 Riccardia spegazziniana  
 Riccardia spinulifera  
 Riccardia spongiosa  
 Riccardia sprucei  
 Riccardia squarrosa  
 Riccardia stipatiflora  
 Riccardia stolonifera  
 Riccardia stricta  
 Riccardia subalpina  
 Riccardia submersa  
 Riccardia submultifida  
 Riccardia subpalmata  
 Riccardia subsimplex

T
 Riccardia tahitensis  
 Riccardia tamariscina  
 Riccardia tenax  
 Riccardia tenella  
 Riccardia tenuicula  
 Riccardia tosana  
 Riccardia trichomanoides  
 Riccardia tumbareriensis  
 Riccardia tutuilana

U
 Riccardia umbana  
 Riccardia umbrosa  
 Riccardia umida

V
 Riccardia valida  
 Riccardia variabilis  
 Riccardia venosa  
 Riccardia villosa  
 Riccardia virens  
 Riccardia vitrea

W
 Riccardia wallisii  
 Riccardia wattsiana  
 Riccardia womersleyana

References

Metzgeriales
Liverwort genera